Mike Tullberg (born 25 December 1985) is a Danish football manager, currently working as the manager of Borussia Dortmund U19, and former professional footballer who played as a forward.

Career

Playing career 
He got his national breakthrough with Danish Superliga club AGF Aarhus when he scored a goal against Danish giants Brøndby IF which was named Danish goal of the year 2007. Tullberg signed for Reggina together with fellow Dane Kris Stadsgaard in 2007. He struggled to gain a regular place in the Reggina team, and Tullberg joined Hearts on a one-year loan deal. In August 2009, he joined Rot-Weiß Oberhausen in the German 2nd Bundesliga. Because of injuries, he came in two years to just four appearances. For this reason his contract was not renewed. A year later, he finished his career.

Coaching career 
A short time later he took over the post of assistant coach at the German district League club SG Schönebeck. A year later he went as a youth coach to his former club Rot-Weiß Oberhausen and a half years later he took over the post of coach at the U-19 of the clubs from Oberhausen.

On 24 March 2017 it was confirmed, that Tullberg would be the new manager of AGF Aarhus U19 starting from the summer 2017.

Borussia Dortmund confirmed on 25 March 2019, that Tullberg had signed with the club and would start his new job as manager of the club's reserve team from the 2019–20 season. In May 2020, the club announced that Tullberg would become manager of the U19 team for the following season; seen as a more prestigious position within the ranks of the club.

References

External links

Danish Superliga statistics 

1985 births
Living people
People from Furesø Municipality
Danish men's footballers
Danish expatriate men's footballers
Reggina 1914 players
Heart of Midlothian F.C. players
Rot-Weiß Oberhausen players
Serie A players
Expatriate footballers in Italy
Expatriate footballers in Scotland
Expatriate footballers in Germany
Danish Superliga players
Scottish Premier League players
Aarhus Gymnastikforening players
Association football forwards
Borussia Dortmund II managers
FC Djursland players
Danish football managers
Danish expatriate sportspeople in Italy
Danish expatriate sportspeople in Scotland
Danish expatriate sportspeople in Germany
Danish expatriate football managers
Expatriate football managers in Germany
Sportspeople from the Capital Region of Denmark